Jonathan Josué Solís Rivas (born 21 August 1993) is a Guatemalan badminton player. In 2010, he won a gold medal at the Central American and Caribbean Games in men's team event. He was the bronze medallists at the 2013 and 2018 Pan Am Championships in the men's doubles event partnered with Rodolfo Ramírez, also in the mixed doubles event in 2018 and 2021 with Diana Corleto.

Achievements

Pan Am Championships 
Men's doubles

Mixed doubles

Central American and Caribbean Games 
Men's doubles

Mixed doubles

BWF International Challenge/Series (24 titles, 15 runner-up) 
Men's doubles

Mixed doubles

  BWF International Challenge tournament
  BWF International Series tournament
  BWF Future Series tournament

References

External links 
 
 Jonathan Solís at toronto2015.org

1993 births
Living people
Guatemalan male badminton players
Badminton players at the 2015 Pan American Games
Badminton players at the 2019 Pan American Games
Pan American Games competitors for Guatemala
Central American and Caribbean Games gold medalists for Guatemala
Central American and Caribbean Games silver medalists for Guatemala
Central American and Caribbean Games bronze medalists for Guatemala
Competitors at the 2010 Central American and Caribbean Games
Competitors at the 2014 Central American and Caribbean Games
Central American and Caribbean Games medalists in badminton
21st-century Guatemalan people